Auto Fritze is a German family television series, broadcast between 1993 and 1994 set in a garage and revolving around the Fritze brothers. One of them is an idealist who commits himself to restoring vintage cars while the other is a materialist specialised in selling only the most expensive and newest cars.

See also
List of German television series

External links
 

1993 German television series debuts
1994 German television series endings
German-language television shows
Das Erste original programming